Cabral (2001–2017), also known as "JP", was a gold medalist dressage horse ridden by Natasha Baker. The Polish-born British dressage horse, a Paralympic gold winner (2012) in Rio, was euthanized.

Background
JP was previously owned by Christian Landolt an FEI Dressage and Eventing rider and judge. He brought JP to event however he was not bold enough in the cross country.

Paralympics
Natasha was selected as part of the dressage squad for Great Britain at the 2012 Summer Paralympics held in London, United Kingdom. In the individual championship test grade II event Baker and Cabral scored 76.857% to set a new Paralympic record for the grade II classification and win the gold medal ahead of German defending champion Britta Napel who won silver with a score of 76.000%. 

She won her second gold medal of the Games in the individual freestyle test grade II. She set a new Paralympic record of 82.800% , beating second placed Napel by over 5%.

Death
Cabral was put down on 26 February 2017 after contracting a bacterial infection.

References 

Dressage horses
2001 animal births
2017 animal deaths
Horses in the Paralympics
Individual warmbloods